Durtal is a commune in the Maine-et-Loire department in western France. It is around 32 km north-east of Angers the department capital.

See also
Communes of the Maine-et-Loire department

References

Communes of Maine-et-Loire
Anjou